Mossendjo (can also be written as Mosenjo or Mosendjo) is a town located in the Niari Region of the Republic of the Congo.

Railways 
The town lies on the Mbinda branch of the Congo railway system.

Infrastructure 
Mossendjo is a city of approximately 10,000 people. It is the regional hub city of the Chaillu Massif mountainous region, north of Dolisie and south of Mayoko and Mbinda. The infrastructure of Mossendjo has been  improved since 2006, owing to the Congo government's program of revitalizing Mossendjo and Dolisie. New streets and sewage drainage systems have been constructed in both cities.

Mossendjo Airport has regularly scheduled airline service to Pointe Noire and Brazzaville, via Air Maouene. Road access to Dolisie and Mayoko still is via rough, sometimes graded dirt roads. The region has cell phone coverage service by TelCel.

Economy
Logging has been a primary industry in the Mossendjo-Mbinda region. Some mineral exploration for iron, gold, and diamonds occurs throughout the region, but no commercial mines are in production. Little agricultural production occurs in the Mossendjo-Mbinda region apart from gathering of bananas and local forest fruits.

District

See also 

 Railway stations in Congo

References 

Niari Department
Populated places in the Republic of the Congo